Accra City Stars are a Ghanaian professional football club, based in Indadfa, Greater Accra. The club is currently competing in the Ghana Poly Tank Division One League.

History

St. Mirren FC

Overview  and club officials 
The club's home strip is yellow and green with matching socks in the same colour, while the away strip is black and white with black and white socks. The official symbol of the club is the eagle and its motto is Where only eagles dare.

The club's board is advised by GFA Executive Committee member Mr. Fred Crentsil, with the following occupying the respective roles: Oloboi Commodre as Director of Operations, Fadi Omari as head coach with Jimmy Kobla and Laryea Korley as assistant coaches.

Commercial strategy 
The Global Village Group acquired newly promoted St. Mirren FC who qualified on top of Zone III in the middle league, beating Royal Knights F.C., Fairpoint F.C., and drawing with Power FC. The club's name has thus been changed to Sporting Mirren FC, SP Mirren for short. As part of the marketing strategy of the club, Global Village secured a sponsorship deal with Metro TV for their inaugural season to the tune of GH¢140,000.00 made up of GH¢70,000.00 cash and GH¢70,000.00 in the form of airtime to promote and market the matches and activities of SP Mirren.

Stadium 
Sporting Mirren FC played its midweek and weekend matches on Thursday and Saturday respectively at Ohene Djan Stadium. The club used the Ajax Park as its training grounds, which is within the same neighbourhood as its clubhouse located near IPS Legon.

St Mirren FC 
The Ghanaian side shares its name with Saint Mirren Football Club, a Scottish professional football club based in Paisley, Scotland. The Scottish St Mirren FC were alerted to the existence of a "Ghana St. Mirren" a few years ago and were delighted to welcome the then chairman, and a selection of the latter's first team, to Scotland for a visit. A link between the two was soon established and Ghana St Mirren received brand new black and white St Mirren FC kits after their Chairman met a supporter, Stuart McIntosh, at the Normandy Hotel near Paisley with the result that McIntosh sent the club the kits. Nevertheless, SP Mirren, as they are now known, have reverted to their original green and yellow shirts.

Season 2008–2009 
The club kicked off their campaign in the Ghana Premier League on November 24 against Accra Hearts of Oak but were beaten 2–0. Other domestic league defeats have since followed, against Chelsea FC, All Stars F.C. & Real Tamale United. Mahatma Otoo was the club's best player after he earned the discovery player of the season award in the 2008–09 season after he won five man of the match awards and got 5 goals from 15 games for his club. They were relegated at the end of the season.

Accra City Stars FC (2018–present)
In late 2017, the club started working on rebranding their club to reflect both the Ghanaian culture and help them grow their fan base. The name of the club was changed to Accra City Stars FC. since the club was based in the regional capital of Ghana. The change of name took effect on 10 January 2018.

Notable players 

 See: Sporting Saint Mirren F.C. players

References 

Football clubs in Ghana
Tema